The Georgian ambassador in Moscow was the official representative of the Government in Tbilisi to the Government of Russia.

List of representatives

References 

Ambassadors of Georgia (country) to Russia
Russia
Georgia